Arvid Brorsson (born 8 May 1999) is a professional Swedish football defender who plays for Mjällby.

Club career
He made his senior league debut for Örebro on 17 May 2017 in their Allsvenskan 0–2 home loss against Sundsvall.

After playing for Örgryte on loan in the second half of the 2020 season, on 22 March 2021 Brorsson moved there on a permanent basis and signed a two-year contract.

In January 2023, Brorsson signed for Mjällby on a contract for the duration of the 2023 season.

References

External links 
 
 Arvid Brorsson at Örebro SK 
 

1999 births
Sportspeople from Örebro
Living people
Swedish footballers
Sweden youth international footballers
Association football defenders
Örebro SK players
Örgryte IS players
Mjällby AIF players
Allsvenskan players
Superettan players